Mary Tassugat (1918–2016) was a Canadian Inuit artist.

Her work is included in the collections of the Musée national des beaux-arts du Québec and the National Gallery of Canada.

Tassugat died in Clyde River, Nunavut in 2016.

References

1918 births
2016 deaths
20th-century Canadian women artists
21st-century Canadian women artists
Inuit artists